"Do You Know Taekwondo?" (  is the fourteenth episode of the third season of the South Korean anthology series KBS Drama Special. Starring Im Ji-kyu, Niel and Han Yeo-reum, it aired on KBS2 on October 7, 2012.

Synopsis
Yoon Do-hyeon dreams of becoming an action star but like his father before him can only get roles as a stunt actor. Out of the blue he is called up by the sports director of his old school, the school Taekwondo team has lost its coach and he wants Yoon Do-hyeon to take over as coach. Although Yoon was on the school Taekwondo team he was not the star athlete, of the same name, that the director thinks he is. However Yoon is just scraping by and takes the job anyway.

The school Taekwondo team is a far cry from the team that Yoon Do-hyeon was a member of, it has just six students who attend training just to bump up their course credits or to avoid detention. To cap it all the three best students at Taekwondo are outright bullies. In order to cut costs the school principal orders the Taekwondo team to be cut if it cannot attract more students.

Despite scepticism by the students Yoon manages to bluff his way through the sessions, using the two skills he does have. His stage combat experience makes him an excellent judge of distance and timing, so much so, that until he loses his concentration, he is impossible to hit. His second skill comes from a lifetime of being bullied by his elder brother, Yoon is very good at taking a beating and not getting hurt. This is enough to convince Choi Myeong-seong, the target of the bullies attacks, to ask Yoon for additional training.

When it appears that Yoon's protege was able to single-handedly defeat all three bullies at the same time, Yoon's reputation as a teacher rises and he finds his class full of those wanting to learn from him, saving the team from being disbanded.

Cast
 Im Ji-kyu as Yoon Do-hyeon
 Ahn Daniel as Choi Myeong-seong
 Han Yeo-reum as Won-seon
 Kim Hee-won as Kwang-hyeon
 Kim So-young as Han-na
 Yoon Park as Seok-ho
 Gi Ju-bong as Teacher Im
 Lee Chae-eun as Hyeon-jin
 Nam Tae-bo as Jeong Tae-ho
 Choi Min-soo as Do-hyeon's father
 Lee Dae-hoon as Rising star Do-hyeon

Ratings

Awards and nominations

References

External links
 
 Do You Know Taekwondo? at KBS World's YouTube channel

2012 South Korean television episodes